Cristescu is a Romanian surname. Notable people with it include:

 Constantin Cristescu, Romanian General
 Daniel Cristescu, Romanian football defender
 Eugen Cristescu, Romanian secret police head
 Gheorghe Cristescu, Romanian socialist
 Marian Cristescu, Romanian football midfielder
 Melania Cristescu, Romanian–Canadian biologist and ecologist
 Silvian Cristescu, Romanian former professional footballer
 Vintilǎ Cristescu, Romanian long-distance runner

See also 
 Cristian (disambiguation)
 Cristești (disambiguation)
 Cristea (surname)

Romanian-language surnames